Buffalo is a live album by Frank Zappa, posthumously released in April 2007 as a two-CD set, consisting of the complete concert given on October 25, 1980 at the Buffalo Memorial Auditorium in Buffalo, New York with a band that has previously been heard on Tinsel Town Rebellion (1981) and Shut Up 'n Play Yer Guitar (1981). It is the second installment on the Vaulternative Records label that is dedicated to the posthumous release of complete Zappa concerts, the first release being FZ:OZ, the concert on January 20, 1976 at the Hordern Pavilion in Sydney.

Track listing 
All songs written, composed and arranged by Frank Zappa.

Musicians 

 Frank Zappa – lead guitar & vocals
 Steve Vai – stunt guitar & background vocals
 Ray White – vocals & rhythm guitar
 Ike Willis – vocals & rhythm guitar
 Tommy Mars – keyboards & vocals
 Bob Harris – keyboards, trumpet & high vocals
 Arthur Barrow – bass & vocals
 Vinnie Colaiuta – drums, vocals

Album credits 

 Frank Zappa – music, performance, band & recordings
 Gail Zappa & Joe Travers – CD production
 Frank Filipetti – mix
 John Polito – mastering
 George Douglas – original recording engineer
 Gail Zappa – art direction/concept & text
 Keith Lawler – design, layout & art execution
 Kaushal Parekh – cover photo

Notes 

Live albums published posthumously
Frank Zappa live albums
2007 live albums